Columella edentula, common name the "toothless column snail", is a species of very small, air-breathing land snail, a terrestrial pulmonate gastropod mollusk or micromollusk in the family Truncatellinidae.

Description
The 2.5-3 (-3.5) mm. shell is cylindrical with a conical apex and yellow-brown to brown. The aperture is without teeth and the simple lip is thin.  The shell has (4.5 )5-6 (-7) whorls. The last whorl has the largest diameter. The apex is  more pointed than in Columella columella. It is narrower and taller than the shell of the similar Columella aspera. The shell sculpture is more irregular and finer than that of C. aspera.

Distribution
This species occurs in countries and islands including:
 Great Britain
 Ireland
 Ukraine

References

 Minato, H. (1988). A systematic and bibliographic list of the Japanese land snails. H. Minato, Shirahama, 294 pp., 7 pls.
 National Institute of Biological Resources. (2019). National Species list of Korea. II. Vertebrates, Invertebrates, Protozoans. Designzip. 908 pp. page(s): 338
 Kerney, M.P., Cameron, R.A.D. & Jungbluth, J-H. (1983). Die Landschnecken Nord- und Mitteleuropas. Ein Bestimmungsbuch für Biologen und Naturfreunde, 384 pp., 24 plates.
 Sysoev, A. V. & Schileyko, A. A. (2009). Land snails and slugs of Russia and adjacent countries. Sofia/Moskva (Pensoft). 312 pp., 142 plates

External links

Columella edentula at Animalbase taxonomy,short description, distribution, biology,status (threats), images
 Draparnaud, J.-P.-R. (1805). Histoire naturelle des mollusques terrestres et fluviatiles de la France. 2 pp. (Avertissement a sa Majesté l'Impératrice), 2 pp. Rapport, i-viii (Préface), 1-164, pl. 1-13, 1 p. Errata
 Schileyko, A. A. & Rymzhanov, T. S. (2013). Fauna of land mollusks (Gastropoda, Pulmonata Terrestria) of Kazakhstan and adjacent territories. Moscow-Almaty: KMK Scientific Press. 389 pp

Truncatellinidae
Gastropods described in 1805